The 1989–90 season was the 81st year of football played by Dundee United, and covers the period from 1 July 1989 to 30 June 1990. United finished in fourth place, securing European football on the final day of the season.

Match results
Dundee United played a total of 47 competitive matches during the 1989–90 season. The team finished fourth in the Scottish Premier Division.

In the cup competitions, United lost in the semi-final of the Tennent's Scottish Cup to eventual winners Aberdeen and lost in the Skol Cup third round to Hamilton.

Legend

All results are written with Dundee United's score first.

Premier Division

Tennent's Scottish Cup

Skol Cup

UEFA Cup

Player details
During the 1989–90 season, United used 25 different players comprising five nationalities. Maurice Malpas was the only player to play in every match. The table below shows the number of appearances and goals scored by each player.

|}

Goalscorers
United had 13 players score with the team scoring 50 goals in total. The top goalscorer was Mixu Paatelainen, who finished the season with nine goals.

Discipline
During the 1989–90 season, one United player was sent off. Statistics for cautions are unavailable.

Team statistics

League table

Transfers

In
The club signed three players during the season with a total public cost of just over £600,000.

Out
Four players were sold by the club during the season with a public total of just over £1m. The club made a profit of around £400k from transfers during the season.

Loans out
One player was loaned out during the season.

Playing kit

The jerseys were sponsored by Belhaven for a third season.

See also
 1989–90 in Scottish football

References

External links
 Glenrothes Arabs 1989–90 season review

1989-90
Scottish football clubs 1989–90 season